This is a compilation of results for teams representing Spain at international women's football competitions such as the UEFA Women's Cup and its successor, the UEFA Women's Champions League. Spanish clubs have taken part since the inaugural 2001–02 season.

From the 2015–16 season the Spanish league has held two spots in the Women's Champions League. Athletic Bilbao, Barcelona, Espanyol, Levante and Rayo Vallecano have qualified as national champions,  and Atlético Madrid and Barcelona as runners-up. So far the most successful team has been Barcelona, having won the competition in 2020–21.

Teams

These are the six teams that have representred Spain in the UEFA Women's Cup and the UEFA Women's Champions League.

Qualification

Historical progression

Results by team

Athletic Bilbao

Atlético Madrid

Barcelona

Espanyol

Levante

Rayo Vallecano

Real Madrid

References

Women's football clubs in international competitions
 Women